Henry Seawell Brown and Mary Jane English Farmstead, also known as the Brown Family Farm, is a historic home and farm located near Ashford, McDowell County, North Carolina.  The farmhouse was built in 1916, and is -story, three bay, frame dwelling with Queen Anne and Colonial Revival style design elements. It has a two-story portico, triangular pedimented front gable, hip-roofed dormers, fish-scale shingles, and one-story wraparound front porch.  It has a two-story rear ell.  Also on the property are a contributing barn and garage (1920s).

It was listed on the National Register of Historic Places in 2009.

References

Houses on the National Register of Historic Places in North Carolina
Queen Anne architecture in North Carolina
Colonial Revival architecture in North Carolina
Houses completed in 1916
Houses in McDowell County, North Carolina
National Register of Historic Places in McDowell County, North Carolina